The woodchoppers of the Orne were 10 Flemish soldiers during the First World War punished for their active or passive involvement in the Flemish Movement in the Belgian Army. They were removed from their platoons and moved to a penal military unit called the Special Forestry Platoon (Peloton Spécial Forestier) in 1918.  In this penal military unit, stationed in Orné, Normandy in France, they had to work as woodchoppers as forced labour. They were required to work 12 hours a day in harsh living conditions, they were paid 1 Belgian franc each day.

The 10 soldiers  were Paul Davidts (oldest of the 10 and spokesperson of the group, lawyer and later acquitted by the court-martial, Lode Beets, Pol Bogaert (from Mechelen), Alfons De Schepper, Karel-Lodewijk De Schepper, Pieter Dox (from Lier, Born 7 May 1898), Ward Hermans (from Turnhout, writer), Maurits Geerardyn, Clement Ledegen and Frans Vannyvel.

The attitude of the 10 soldiers was defined as defeatism by the French-speaking military leaders. Fearing that the soldiers would desert to the German forces they were sent deep into France to work as woodchoppers.

See also
 Van Raemdonck brothers
 Frontbeweging

References

World War I
Penal units
Law of war
Belgian legislation
Legal history of Belgium
Politics of Belgium
Political history of Belgium
Belgium
Languages of Belgium
Bilingualism in Belgium
Belgium
Belgian Army personnel of World War I